The list of ship launches in 1776 includes a chronological list of some ships launched in 1776.


References

1776
Ship launches